Fumukwe is a village in Manama ward the province of Matabeleland South, Zimbabwe. It is located south of Gwanda on the road to Manama.

The village is a small commercial centre.

The Thuli River runs just west of the town.

Populated places in Matabeleland South Province